Karnataka Theological College (founded in 1847) is an ecumenical seminary catering to the Kannada-speaking students wishing to pursue the priestly vocation.   KTC is located in Mangalore of Karnataka in South India, and is affiliated to the nation's first University, the Senate of Serampore College.

History

The Karnataka Theological College was founded in 1847 with the coming together of two distinct theological seminaries,
 the Union Kanarese Seminary (UKS) founded in 1912 in Tumkur, and
 the Basel Evangelical Mission Theological Seminary (BEMTS) founded in 1847 in Mangalore.

In 1967, C. D. Jathanna, the then principal of the college formed the Karnataka Christian Educational Society with the College as the nucleus along with another institute, the Hebich Technical Training Institute. He added several new educational institutions such as Balmatta Institute of Printing Technology, Balmatta Institute of Commerce, KACES ITI in Stichcraft, KACES Hostel, and Moegling Institute of German Language. At Present Karnataka Theological College offers residential Bachelor of Divinity degree course and the external courses of B.C.S., Dip. C.S. and C. Th.  The students are basically from three dioceses of the Church of South India, Lutherans and Methodists and this is the only regional Theological College which offers training in Kannada language in Karnataka.

Present staff

Gallery

Succession of Administrators

Notable persons associated with the seminary
 The Rev.✝ D. P. Shettian, Past pupil and Bishop,
 The Rev.✝ S. R. Furtado, Faculty member and Bishop,
 The Rev.✝ S. J. Samartha, Faculty member of the erstwhile Basel Evangelical Mission Theological Seminary,
 The Rev. Devaraj Bangera, Past pupil and Bishop Emeritus,
 The Rev. D. I. Hans, Teacher of Religions.

References

Christian seminaries and theological colleges in India
Universities and colleges in Mangalore
Educational institutions established in 1965
Reformed church seminaries and theological colleges
Anglican seminaries and theological colleges
Universities and colleges affiliated with the Church of South India
Seminaries and theological colleges affiliated to the Senate of Serampore College (University)
1965 establishments in Mysore State